Dan Everett Waid (1864–1939) was a prominent 20th century architect operating primarily in Illinois and New York. As chief architect for the Metropolitan Life Insurance Company (New York City), he and his partner designed the Home Office Building at 11 Madison Avenue along with dozens of other commercial, religious, residential and academic structures. He was appointed architect for the Board of Foreign Missions of the Presbyterian Church. He was also President of the American Institute of Architects (1924–1926).

Early life 
Waid was born in Gouverneur, New York on March 31, 1864. At the age of 14, his family moved to Monmouth, Illinois, and after high school, he studied architecture at Monmouth College.

Waid graduated from Monmouth College in Illinois in 1887. The son of a dentist, he began his career as a bookkeeper at the site of the construction of a large grain elevator at Dubuque, Iowa, where he gained knowledge of practical construction methods.

Career 
In 1888 he moved to Chicago, securing a position as a draftsman in the office of prominent architects Jenney & Mundie, where he rose to the position of head draftsman.

In 1894, after taking a course at The Art Institute of Chicago, he became an independent architect. Shortly thereafter, Waid submitted two designs for buildings at Monmouth College (Illinois). Having moved to New York City by 1898, Waid and an associate submitted the winning design in a competition for the Long Island College Hospital in Brooklyn, New York where they acted as their own draftsmen and specification writers. When that job was completed, they opened a small office on Fifth Avenue in New York City and were also appointed architect for the Board of Foreign Missions of the Presbyterian Church, which had offices in the same building. This led to his design of hospitals in Alaska and Puerto Rico as well as schools in the western United States and Cuba.

During World War I, Waid served as deputy director of production and as one of the executives of the organization of architects that designed and built housing structures for some twenty-five shipbuilding yards.

Waid's career reached its pinnacle when he became chief architect for the Metropolitan Life Insurance Company and designed, with his business partner Harvey Wiley Corbett, the Home Office Building at 11 Madison Avenue and now known as the Metropolitan Life North Building. Originally planned to be the tallest building in the world at 100 stories, it was a victim of the depression and was capped off at 29 floors. In stark contrast with his early work, the modern office building would eschew, “extraneous ornament or embellishment which has not a rational meaning and practical use” and that it would be “unhampered by archaeological precedent.”

He was President of the New York state Board of Examiners and Registration of Architects from 1915 until 1923.

Waid was also a consulting architect for the Empire State Building and Rockefeller Center in New York City. He also was involved with the B.F. Goodrich Company buildings in Manhattan.

Later life, awards and philanthropy 
Waid was President of the American Institute of Architects from 1924-1926 and was elevated to a Fellow of the American Institute of Architects. He was awarded a Gold Medal by the New York Chapter of the American Institute of Architects.

He endowed a fine arts department at Monmouth College in memory of his first wife Eva Clark Waid (January 1869—June 1929). He also donated $80,000 towards a new gymnasium that his firm was designing and then topped off that gift with another $10,000 to build the Waid Swimming Pool in that building. At the time of his death, the Waids were the largest donors in the history of the college. He married a second time, to Phyllis Fellowes Colmore, a British subject, on Feb. 2, 1934 but had no children from either marriage. In 1936, he restored the bronze and marble Pulitzer Fountain in New York City. More significantly, he left $300,000 to the American Institute of Architects.

Waid died on October 31, 1939 at Old Greenwich, Conn.

Projects 
Among the many buildings Waid designed were:
 Girl's Mutual Benefit Club (Chicago 1892, Richardsonian Romanesque)
 Monmouth College Auditorium & Gymnasium (1895, Richardsonian Romanesque, not built)
 Monmouth College Auditorium & Chapel (1895, Monmouth, Ill., Old English Chapel)
 Fifth Presbyterian Church (Chicago 1896, Gothic Revival)
 Free Public Library of the Medical Society of the County of Kings, Brooklyn, New York (1897)
 Numerous residences in the Chicago area including in Evanston, Illinois in 1900 and his own residence in Chicago at 9332 S. Damen Avenue (1894, American Queen Anne)
 McGregor Sanitarium near Saratoga Springs, N.Y., a complex of over 30 buildings (started 1911, American Craftsman; except chapel built in Mission Revival)
 Perrot Library in Old Greenwich, Connecticut, inspired by Monticello, the home of Thomas Jefferson (Jeffersonian Neo-Classical)
 Metropolitan Life Insurance Company Hall of Records, Yonkers, New York, listed on the National Register of Historic Places in 2014.
 Monmouth College Gymnasium (1923)
 Metropolitan Life  Insurance Company Tower, northern annex, in New York City (1921); demolished to make way for Metropolitan Life North Building also designed by Waid
 Metropolitan Life Building now Wellington Building, House of Commons, Ottawa, Ontario, Canada (1926, Beaux-Arts)
 Buildings at The College of Wooster, Ohio including President's House (c. 1926, Gothic Revival), Douglass Hall (1929, Collegiate Gothic), Galpin Hall (1932, Gothic Revival), Babcock Hall (1936, Collegiate Gothic) and at least one of the Henderson Memorial Apartments (1939). 
 Home Office Building in New York City also known as the Metropolitan Life North Building, New York City (started 1928, finished 1950, Art Deco)

References

External links

1864 births
1939 deaths
20th-century American architects
Monmouth College alumni
American Presbyterians